Adab or Udab (Sumerian:  Adabki, spelled UD.NUNKI) was an ancient Sumerian city between Telloh and Nippur. It was located at the site of modern Bismaya or Bismya in the Wasit Province of Iraq.

Archaeology

Initial examinations of the site of Bismaya were by William Hayes Ward of the Wolfe Expedition in 1885 and by John Punnett Peters of the University of Pennsylvania in 1890, each spending a day there and finding one cuneiform table and a few fragments. Walter Andrae visited Bismaya in 1902, found a table fragment and produced a sketch map of the site.

Excavations were conducted there for a total of six months, between Christmas of 1903 and June 1905, for the University of Chicago, primarily by Dr. Edgar James Banks, with the final part of the dig being under engineer Victor S. Persons. It proved that these mounds covered the site of the ancient city of Adab (Ud-Nun), hitherto known only from the Sumerian King List and a brief mention of its name in the introduction to the Hammurabi Code. The city was divided into two parts by a canal, on an island in which stood the temple, E-mach, with a ziggurat, or stepped tower. It was evidently once a city of considerable importance, but deserted at a very early period, since the ruins found close to the surface of the mounds belong to Shulgi and Ur-Nammu, kings of the Third Dynasty of Ur in the latter part of the third millennium BC, based on inscribed bricks excavated at Bismaya. Immediately below these, as at Nippur, were found artifacts dating to the reign of Naram-Suen and Sargon of Akkad, c. 2300 BC. Below these there were still  of stratified remains, constituting seven-eighths of the total depth of the ruins. Besides the remains of buildings, walls and graves, Dr. Banks discovered a large number of inscribed clay tablets of a very early period, bronze and stone tablets, bronze implements and the like.

Of the tablets, 543 went to the Oriental Institute and roughly 1100, mostly purchased from the locals rather than excavated, went to the Istanbul Museum. The latter are still  unpublished. Brick stamps, found by Banks during his excavation of Adab state that the Akkadian ruler Naram-Suen built a temple to Inanna at Adab, but the temple was not found during the dig, and is not known for certain to be E-shar. The two most notable discoveries were a complete statue in white marble, apparently the earliest yet found in Mesopotamia, now in the Istanbul Archaeology Museums, bearing the inscription, translated by Banks as "E-mach, King Da-udu, King of, Ud-Nun", now known as the statue of Lugal-dalu; and a temple refuse heap, consisting of great quantities of fragments of vases in marble, alabaster, onyx, porphyry and granite, some of which were inscribed, and others engraved and inlaid with ivory and precious stones.

Of the Adab tablets that ended up at the University of Chicago, sponsor of the excavations, all have been published and also made available in digital form online. Banks also purchased Adab tablets locally and sold them sold piecemeal to various owners over years. A few have made their way into publication.

Though the Banks expedition to Bismaya was well documented by the standards of the time and many objects photographed, no final report was ever produced due to personal disputes. Recently, the Oriental Institute has re-examined the records and objects returned to the institute by Banks and produced a report.

In response to widespread looting, the Iraq State Board of Antiquities and Heritage conducted an excavation at Adab in 2001. The site has now been largely destroyed by systematic looting so further excavation is unlikely On the order of a thousand tablet from that looting, all from the Sargonic Period, have been sold to various collectors and many are being published, though missing archaeological context.

From 2016 to 2019 the University of Bologna and the Iraqi State Board of Antiquities and Heritage conducted a program of coordinated remote sensing and surface surveys in the Qadisiyah province including at Bismaya. Results included a "Preliminary reconstruction of the urban layout and hydraulic landscape around Bismaya/Adab in the ED III and Akkadian periods ". A previously unknown palace was discovered and the extent of looting identified. It also determined that the city was surrounded by canals.

There is a Sumerian comic tale of the Three Ox-drivers from Adab.

Occupation history

Early Dynastic Period
Adab was occupied from at least the  Early Dynastic Period. According to Sumerian text Inanna's descent to the netherworld, there was a temple of Inanna named E-shar at Adab during the reign of Dumuzid of Uruk. In another text in the same series, Dumuzid's dream, Dumuzid of Uruk is toppled from his opulence by a hungry mob composed of men from the major cities of Sumer, including Adab.

A king of Kish, Mesilim, appears to have ruled at Adab, based on inscriptions found at Bismaya. One king of Adab, Lugal-Anne-Mundu, appearing in the Sumerian King List, is mentioned in few contemporary inscriptions; some that are much later copies claim that he established a vast, but brief empire stretching from Elam all the way to Lebanon and the Amorite territories along the Jordan. Adab is also mentioned in some of the Ebla tablets from roughly the same era as a trading partner of Ebla in northern Syria, shortly before Ebla was destroyed by unknown forces.

A marble statue was found at Bismaya inscribed with the name of another king of Adab, variously translated as Lugal-daudu, Da-udu, Lugaldalu, and Esar.

Sargonic Period
Meskigal, governor of Adab under Lugalzagesi of Uruk, changed allegiance to Akkad and became governor under Sargon of Akkad. He later joined the Great Rebellion against Naram-Sin and was defeated. Various governors, including Sarru-alli and Lugal-ajagu then ruled Adab under direct Akkadian control.
By the end of the Akkadian period, Adab was occupied by the Gutians, who made it their capital.

Several governors of the city under Ur III are also known. While no later archaeological evidence was found at Bismaya, the excavations there were brief, and there were later epigraphic references to Adab, such as in the Code of Hammurabi.

Rulers of Adab

Gallery

See also
Cities of the Ancient Near East

References

Further reading
Edgar James Banks, The Bismya Temple, The American Journal of Semitic Languages and Literatures, Vol. 22, No. 1, pp. 29–34, Oct. 1905
D. D. Luckenbill, Two Inscriptions of Mesilim, King of Kish, The American Journal of Semitic Languages and Literatures, Vol. 30, No. 3, pp. 219–223, Apr. 1914
Edgar James Banks, The Oldest Statue in the World, The American Journal of Semitic Languages and Literatures, Vol. 21, No. 1, pp. 57–59, Oct. 1904
Yang Zhi, The Excavation of Adab, Journal of Ancient Civilizations, Vol. 3, pp. 16–19, 1988
D. D. Luckenbill,  Old Babylonian Letters from Bismya, The American Journal of Semitic Languages and Literatures, vol. 32, no. 4, pp. 270–292, 1916
Caroline Nestmann Peck, "The Excavations at Bismaya", Ph.D. dissertation, University of Chicago, 1949
 Maiocchi, Massimo. Classical Sargonic tablets chiefly from Adab in the Cornell University collections/[1]. Vol. 13. CDL Press, 2009
Karen Wilson, "The Temple Mound at Bismaya", in Leaving No Stones Unturned: Essays on the Ancient Near East and Egypt in Honor of Donald P. Hansen, Penn State University Press, 2002

External links
Oriental Institute page for Bismaya: Recovering the Lost City of Adab
Three Ox-drivers from Adab
Recent article on Edgar James Banks in "World and I"
NY Times note on the Bismaya excavations dated 1904
Bismaya "re-excavation" project being funded by Shelby White - Leon Levy Program
Translation of Three Ox-Drivers from Adab

Populated places disestablished in the 3rd millennium BC
1885 archaeological discoveries
Sumerian cities
Archaeological sites in Iraq
Former populated places in Iraq
Wasit Governorate
3rd-millennium BC disestablishments in Sumer
Early Dynastic Period (Mesopotamia)
Former kingdoms